The German given name Johann Georg, or its variant spellings, may refer to:

John George
John George, Elector of Brandenburg (1525–1598)
John George I, Elector of Saxony (1585–1656)
John George II, Elector of Saxony (1613–1680)
John George III, Elector of Saxony (1647–1691)
John George IV, Elector of Saxony (1668–1694)
 Johann Georg Abicht (1672–1740), German Lutheran theologian
 Johann Georg Albrechtsberger (1736–1809), Austrian musician
 Johann Georg Baiter (1801–1877), Swiss philologist and textual critic
 Johann-Georg Bendl (before 1620 – 1680), Baroque sculptor mainly at work in Prague
 Johann Georg Bergmüller (1688–1762), Bavarian painter, particularly of frescoes of the Baroque
 Johann Georg Bodmer (1786–1864), Swiss inventor
 Johann Georg, Chevalier de Saxe (1704–1774), Saxonian General and Governor of Dresden 
 Johann Georg Christian Lehmann (1792–1860), German botanist
 Johann Georg, Duke of Saxe-Weissenfels (1677–1712), duke of Saxe-Weissenfels-Querfurt and a member of the House of Wettin
 Johann Georg Estor (1699–1773), German theorist of public law, historian and book collector
 Johann Georg Faust (1466? – c. 1540), itinerant alchemist, astrologer and magician of the German Renaissance
 Johann Georg Fischer (1816–1897), German poet and playwright
 Johann Georg Gichtel (1638–1710), German mystic
 Johann Georg Gmelin (1709–1755), German naturalist, botanist and geographer
 Johann Georg Graevius (1632–1703), German classical scholar and critic
 Johann Georg Grasel (1790–1818), leader of a robber's gang, his name is used in Czech as common term for rascal or villain
 Johann Georg Hagen (1847–1930), German astronomer and Catholic priest
 Johann Georg Hamann (1730–1788),philosopher of the German (Counter-)Enlightenment
 Johann Georg Heine (1771–1838), German orthopedic mechanic and physician 
 Johann Georg Hiedler (1792–1857), German, considered the officially accepted grandfather of Adolf Hitler by the Third Reich
 Johann Georg Jacobi (1740–1814), German poet
 Johann Georg Krünitz (1728–1796), German encyclopedist 
 Johann Georg Palitzsch (1723–1788), German astronomer
 Johann Georg Pisendel (1687–1755), German Baroque musician, violinist and composer 
 Johann Georg Repsold (1770–1830), German astronomer
 Johann Georg Ritter von Zimmermann
 Johann Georg Specht (1728–1795), Swiss philosophical writer and physician
 Johann Georg Sulzer (1720–1779), Swiss professor of mathematics, who later on moved on to the field of electricity
 Johann Georg Tralles (1763–1822), German mathematician and physicist
 Johann Georg von Brandenburg (1577–1624), German nobleman
 Johann Georg von Eckhart (1664–1730), German historian
 Johann Georg von Hahn (1811–1869), Austrian diplomat, philologist and specialist in Albanian history, language and culture
 Johann Georg von Soldner (1776–1833), German physicist, mathematician and astronomer 
 Johann Georg Wagler (1800–1832), German herpetologist
 Johann Georg Walch (1693–1775), German theologian
 Johann Georg Wirsung (1589–1643), German anatomist

Johann George
 Johann George Moeresius
 Johann George Tromlitz

See also
 Johan (given name)
 Johann

Given names